Leye or LEYE may refer to:

People
An Leye (born 1970), Tibetan-Australian poet
Christian Leye (born 1981), German politician
Femi Leye (born 1989), Nigerian musician
Goddy Leye (1965–2011), Cameroonian artist and intellectual
Jean-Marie Léyé (1932–2004), President of Vanuatu
Mbaye Leye (born 1982), soccer football striker from Senegal
Wilderich Freiherr Ostman von der Leye (1923–1990), German politician

Places
Leye, Alishan (樂野), a village in Chiayi County, Taiwan
Leye County (乐业县), Guangxi, PRC China

Other uses
Lettuce Entertain You Enterprises, an American restaurant group

See also

 
 Ley (disambiguation)
 Leyes (disambiguation)
 Leyens (disambiguation)